Franklin Township is one of eleven townships in Montgomery County, Indiana, United States. As of the 2010 census, its population was 1,915 and it contained 801 housing units.

Franklin Township was established in 1831.

History
Darlington Covered Bridge was listed on the National Register of Historic Places in 1990.

Geography

Cities, towns, villages
 Darlington

Unincorporated towns
 Darlington Woods at 
 Shannondale at 
(This list is based on USGS data and may include former settlements.)

Cemeteries
The township contains Greenlawn Cemetery.

Major highways
  Interstate 74
  Indiana State Road 32

School districts
 North Montgomery Community School Corporation

Political districts
 Indiana's 4th congressional district
 State House District 28
 State Senate District 23

References
 
 United States Census Bureau 2008 TIGER/Line Shapefiles
 IndianaMap

External links
 Indiana Township Association
 United Township Association of Indiana
 City-Data.com page for Franklin Township

Townships in Montgomery County, Indiana
Townships in Indiana